Poojitha Menon is an Indian actress, television personality and anchor. Known for roles in Malayalam film and television industry.

Early life

Poojitha Menon was born and brought up in Kuwait. She did her schooling in Thrissur and then Pursued her degree from GRD and NIFT Bangalore.

Career
Poojitha Menon made her Malayalam film debut in Nee Ko Njaa Cha after she has established herself as a model and television personality.

Filmography

Television

As host
 Innathe Cinema (Mazhavil Manorama)
 5 Sundarikal (Mazhavil Manorama)
 Valentine's Corner(We TV)
 Super Star the Ultimate ( Amrita TV)
 Page 3 ( Kappa TV)
Tharapadham Chethoharam (Asianet Plus)
 Super challenge ( Surya TV)
Dream Home (Rosebowl)
 A day with the Star (Kaumudy TV)
 Oh My God - (Kaumudy TV) 
 Celebrity Cricket League  (Surya TV) 
 Festival with Joy Alukkas (Asianet)
Dare The Fear : extra time (Asianet)
 Cinema Diary (Asianet)
Valentine's Diary (YouTube) 
Onathumbi
Onam Samam Payasam
Unnikkoppam

As Contestant 
Dare The Fear  (Asianet)
Thakarppan Comedy (Mazhavil Manorama)
Boeing Boeing (Zee Keralam)

 As Mentor
 Red Carpet (Amrita TV)
 top singer Season 2(Flowers)

TV series
Ente Kuttikalude Achan (Mazhavil Manorama) as Sangeetha
Rani Raja ( Mazhavil Manorama) as Priyamvatha

References

External links
 

Indian film actresses
Actresses in Malayalam cinema
Living people
21st-century Indian actresses
Indian television actresses
Actresses in Malayalam television
Year of birth missing (living people)
Place of birth missing (living people)